The Army of Occupation was the name of the U.S. Army commanded by Zachary Taylor during the Mexican–American War.

Creation
On April 23, 1845, Brevet Brigadier General Zachary Taylor was appointed to command the 1st Military District along the Texas/Louisiana border.  On April 27 Taylor received orders to move with a "Corps of Observation" to the Texas frontier.  Taylor moved his forces to Corpus Christi and established a base there.  While at Corpus Christi, Taylor named the forces assembled there the Army of Occupation.

Operations on the Rio Grande
In May 1846, the army numbered 2,400 and was divided into two brigades.  The 1st Brigade was commanded by Lt. Col. William G. Belknap and would be the right wing of the army.  The 2nd Brigade was commanded by Colonel David E. Twiggs and was the left wing.  Taylor defeated the Mexican army at the battles of Palo Alto and Resaca de la Palma.

Order of Battle

Monterrey

Taylor received significant reinforcements for an invasion of northern Mexico.  The Army of Occupation was organized into four divisions, two of them being made up mostly of volunteers and two of them mostly regulars.  David Twiggs was given command of the 1st Division of Regulars and Brigadier General William J. Worth of the 2nd Division of Regulars.  The 1st Division of Volunteers under the command of Kentucky native, General William O. Butler who also served as Taylor's second-in-command.  The 2nd Division of Volunteers was placed under the command of General Robert Patterson.  James Pinckney Henderson, governor of Texas and major general of Texas commanded the so-called "Texas Division" composed of two mounted regiments, one of them being the famous Texas Rangers under Col. John C. Hays.  Patterson's 2nd Division was stationed at Camargo until he received orders directly from the Secretary of War to proceed to and occupy the coastal city of Tampico.  

Taylor and the remaining three divisions along with Henderson's Texans, numbering around 6,000, moved into northern Mexico to fight the battle of Monterrey.  The enlistments of several of the volunteer units ran out just prior to the battle.  Many of the volunteers went home but several stayed and the remnant were formed into new units.  Colonel Albert Sidney Johnston's regiment of Texas volunteers time ran out.  A company was formed of Mississippi and Texas volunteers that volunteered to stay and Colonel Johnston was made inspector general to General Butler.  A whole brigade of Louisiana volunteers' time had run out and all left except one company's worth of soldiers who stayed and called themselves the "Phoenix Company".  

General Twiggs' Division was to lead the attack on Monterrey but prior to the battle he overdosed on his usual laxative and was forced to turn command over to Lt. Col. John Garland.  During the fighting General Butler was wounded and forced to relinquish command to Brig. Gen. Thomas L. Hamer.  Generals Worth and Henderson and Col. Jefferson Davis served as commissioners for the surrender of Monterrey and the army occupied the city for several months after.  During this period of occupation General Hamer unexpectedly died from sickness.

Order of Battle at Monterrey
 Commander – Major General Zachary Taylor
Inspector General, U.S.A. - Colonel George Croghan

Unattached units
 Company C, 1st U.S. Heavy Artillery - Captain Lucien B. Webster

Forces Stationed at Camargo

Buena Vista 
After capturing Monterrey most of the units in the Army of Occupation were transferred to Winfield Scott for the invasion of central Mexico and in October Henderson's Texans returned home.  Taylor felt that the transfer of these forces was an attempt by his political rival President James K. Polk to deprive Taylor of any further military glory.  Taylor decided instead to move south to Saltillo, Coahuila, where he diverted the Center Division under John E. Wool from its expedition against Chihuahua and ordered it to Saltillo.  Together with the Center Division the Army of Occupation numbered 4,500 and Wool became second-in-command to Taylor.  The army had only one organized brigade; the Indiana Brigade under General Joseph Lane composed of the 2nd and 3rd Indiana regiments.  The rest of the army was made up of 4 volunteer infantry regiments, 2 volunteer cavalry regiments, 2 regiments of U.S. dragoons and 4 battalions of U.S. artillery, all reporting directly to generals Wool and Taylor.  Antonio López de Santa Anna assembled an army of 25,000 and marched to destroy the Americans at Saltillo.  Taylor met Santa Anna at the Battle of Buena Vista and although greatly outnumbered defeated the Mexicans.

Army of Occupation - Major General Zachary Taylor

Evacuation
In November 1847 Taylor left Mexico and returned to the United States.  Command of the Army of Occupation was transferred to General Wool.  Wool made plans for various campaigns in northern Mexico, but the war came to an end before he could undertake any significant campaign.  Wool thus oversaw the evacuation of the army from Mexico.  The evacuation was well underway by July 1848 when Wool requested to be relieved due to illness.  On July 23, command of the Army of Occupation was transferred to Colonel William Davenport, who moved the remaining units of the army to Fort Brown along the Rio Grande.

References

 Bauer, K. Jack, "The Mexican-American War 1846-48"
 Official Battle Reports

See also
 Army of the West (1846)

Notes
 The unit was temporarily attached to the Texas Division during the battle.

External links
A Continent Divided: The U.S. - Mexico War, Center for Greater Southwestern Studies, the University of Texas at Arlington

Army of Occupation